Phyllonorycter mirbeckifoliae is a moth of the family Gracillariidae. It is known from Tunisia.

The larvae feed on Quercus mirbeckii. They mine the leaves of their host plant. The mine is found on the underside of the leaf.

References

mirbeckifoliae
Endemic fauna of Tunisia
Moths described in 1974
Moths of Africa